Albert Harris may refer to:

 Albert Edward Harris (died 1933), British engineer and artist
 Albert T. Harris (1915–1942), lieutenant in the Naval Reserve and Navy Cross recipient
 Albert Harris (footballer) (1912–1995), English football winger in the 1930s
 Albert Harris (football manager), English amateur footballer for Bradford City
 Albert Harris (composer) (1916–2005), Hollywood orchestrator, arranger and composer
 Albert L. Harris (1869–1933), English-born American architect
 Ted Harris (company director) (Albert Edward Harris, born 1927), Australian company director

See also
Al Harris (disambiguation)
Bert Harris (disambiguation)